Deaton is an English locational surname.

Notable people with this name include:

Angus Deaton (born 1945), British-American economist and academic
Bethany Deaton (died 2012), American who was murdered involving the International House of Prayer
Brady J. Deaton (born 1942), American educator
Charles Deaton (1921–1996), American architect
Dedie Deaton (1903-1986), American chief establishment officer of the Women Airforce Service Pilots
Dawson Deaton (born 1999), American football player
Jim Deaton, college coach of American football
Joel Deaton (born 1957), American professional wrestler
Les Deaton (1923–1989), American professional basketball player and college coach
Sierra Deaton (born 1991), American singer in the duo Alex & Sierra

References